Since playing their first international cricket match in December 1960, the South Africa national women's cricket team have contested a number of cricket series against other nations, in all three forms of the game: Test, One Day International and Twenty20 International cricket. A cricket series can consist of any number of individual matches, but typically includes between one and five matches.

The first international cricket match involving South Africa women was a Test match in 1960, held at St George's Park, Port Elizabeth, the same venue as the one for first men's Test match in the country in 1889, and ended in a draw. South Africa then played a subsequent series against New Zealand in 1971–72. As part of the international campaign against apartheid, the Commonwealth of Nations signed the Gleneagles Agreement in 1977, excluding South Africa from competing in international sporting events. Because of this exclusion, they did not play another Test until hosting India in 2001–02, before facing England again in 2003, the Netherlands in 2007 and most recently India in 2014.

One Day International and Twenty20 International series have been contested regularly since 1997 and 2007 respectively.

Key
 Season denotes the cricket season in which the series takes place.
 H/A/N denotes whether the venue is home (South Africa), away (opposition's home) or neutral.
 First match denotes the date on which the first match of the series commenced.
 Matches denotes how many matches were played in the series.
 W denotes how many matches in the series were won by South Africa.
 L denotes how many matches in the series were lost by South Africa.
 T denotes how many matches in the series were tied.
 Drawn denotes how many matches in the series were drawn.
 Won denotes that the series was won by South Africa.
 Lost denotes that the series was lost by South Africa.

Test series

One Day International series
{| class="wikitable sortable" 
|- 
! Series
! Season
! Opponent/Event
! H/A/N
! First match
! Matches
! W
! L
! T
! N/R
! Aban
! Result
! class="unsortable" | Ref
|-
| align="center" | 1
| 1997
| 
| Away
| 
| align="center" | 3
| align="center" | 3
| align="center" | 0
| align="center" | 0
| align="center" | 0
| align="center" | 0
| Won
| 
|-
| align="center" | 2
| 1997
| 
| Away
| 
| align="center" | 5
| align="center" | 1
| align="center" | 2
| align="center" | 0
| align="center" | 1
| align="center" | 1
| Lost
| 
|-
| align="center" | 3
| 1997–98
| Women's Cricket World Cup
| Neutral (in India)
| 
| align="center" | 6
| align="center" | 3
| align="center" | 3
| align="center" | 0
| align="center" | 0
| align="center" | 0
| Eliminated in quarter-finals
| 
|-
| align="center" | 4
| 1998–99
| 
| Away
| 
| align="center" | 3
| align="center" | 0
| align="center" | 2
| align="center" | 0
| align="center" | 0
| align="center" | 1
| Lost
| 
|-
| align="center" | 5
| 1998–99
| 
| Away
| 
| align="center" | 3
| align="center" | 0
| align="center" | 3
| align="center" | 0
| align="center" | 0
| align="center" | 0
| Lost
| 
|-
| align="center" | 6
| 2000
| 
| Away
| 
| align="center" | 5
| align="center" | 2
| align="center" | 3
| align="center" | 0
| align="center" | 0
| align="center" | 0
| Lost
| 
|-
| align="center" | 7
| 2000–01
| Women's Cricket World Cup
| Neutral (in New Zealand)
| 
| align="center" | 8
| align="center" | 4
| align="center" | 4
| align="center" | 0
| align="center" | 0
| align="center" | 0
| Eliminated in semifinals
| 
|-
| align="center" | 8
| 2001–02
| 
| Home
| 
| align="center" | 4
| align="center" | 2
| align="center" | 1
| align="center" | 0
| align="center" | 1
| align="center" | 0
| Won
| 
|-
| align="center" | 9
| 2003
| 
| Away
| 
| align="center" | 3
| align="center" | 1
| align="center" | 2
| align="center" | 0
| align="center" | 0
| align="center" | 0
| Lost
| 
|-
| align="center" | 10
| 2003–04
| 
| Home
| 
| align="center" | 5
| align="center" | 1
| align="center" | 4
| align="center" | 0
| align="center" | 0
| align="center" | 0
| Lost
| 
|-
| align="center" | 11
| 2004–05
| 
| Home
| 
| align="center" | 2
| align="center" | 0
| align="center" | 2
| align="center" | 0
| align="center" | 0
| align="center" | 0
| Lost
| 
|-
| align="center" | 12
| 2004–05
| Women's Cricket World Cup
| Neutral (in South Africa)
| 
| align="center" | 7
| align="center" | 1
| align="center" | 4
| align="center" | 0
| align="center" | 1
| align="center" | 1
| Eliminated in group-stage
| 
|-
| align="center" | 13
| 2004–05
| 
| Home
| 
| align="center" | 3
| align="center" | 1
| align="center" | 2
| align="center" | 0
| align="center" | 0
| align="center" | 0
| Lost
| 
|-
| align="center" | 14
| 2006–07
| 
| Home
| 
| align="center" | 5
| align="center" | 4
| align="center" | 0
| align="center" | 0
| align="center" | 1
| align="center" | 0
| Won
| 
|-
| align="center" | 15
| 2007
| 
| Away
| 
| align="center" | 3
| align="center" | 3
| align="center" | 0
| align="center" | 0
| align="center" | 0
| align="center" | 0
| Won
| 
|-
| align="center" | 16
| 2007–08
| Women's Cricket World Cup Qualifier
| Neutral (in South Africa)
| 
| align="center" | 5
| align="center" | 5
| align="center" | 0
| align="center" | 0
| align="center" | 0
| align="center" | 0
| Won
| 
|-
| align="center" | 17
| 2008
| 
| Neutral (in England)
| 
| align="center" | 1
| align="center" | 1
| align="center" | 0
| align="center" | 0
| align="center" | 0
| align="center" | 0
| Won
| 
|-
| align="center" | 18
| 2008
| 
| Away
| 
| align="center" | 5
| align="center" | 0
| align="center" | 4
| align="center" | 0
| align="center" | 0
| align="center" | 1
| Lost
| 
|-
| align="center" | 19
| 2008–09
| Women's Cricket World Cup
| Neutral (in Australia)
| 
| align="center" | 4
| align="center" | 1
| align="center" | 3
| align="center" | 0
| align="center" | 0
| align="center" | 0
| Seventh place
| 
|-
| align="center" | 20
| 2009–10
| 
| Home
| 
| align="center" | 4
| align="center" | 2
| align="center" | 1
| align="center" | 1
| align="center" | 0
| align="center" | 0
| Won
| 
|-
| align="center" | 21
| 2010–11
| Women's Cricket Challenge
| Neutral (in South Africa)
| 
| align="center" | 5
| align="center" | 5
| align="center" | 0
| align="center" | 0
| align="center" | 0
| align="center" | 0
| Won
| 
|-
| align="center" | 22
| 2011–12
| 
| Home
| 
| align="center" | 3
| align="center" | 0
| align="center" | 3
| align="center" | 0
| align="center" | 0
| align="center" | 0
| Lost
| 
|-
| align="center" | 23
| 2011–12
| Women's Cricket World Cup Qualifier
| Neutral (in Bangladesh)
| 
| align="center" | 6
| align="center" | 4
| align="center" | 2
| align="center" | 0
| align="center" | 0
| align="center" | 0
| Fourth place
| 
|-
| align="center" | 24
| 2012–13
| 
| Away
| 
| align="center" | 3
| align="center" | 2
| align="center" | 1
| align="center" | 0
| align="center" | 0
| align="center" | 0
| Won
| 
|-
| align="center" | 25
| 2012–13
| 
| Away
| 
| align="center" | 5
| align="center" | 2
| align="center" | 2
| align="center" | 0
| align="center" | 1
| align="center" | 0
| Drawn
| 
|-
| align="center" | 26
| 2012–13
| Women's Cricket World Cup
| Neutral (in India)
| 
| align="center" | 7
| align="center" | 2
| align="center" | 5
| align="center" | 0
| align="center" | 0
| align="center" | 0
| Sixth place
| 
|-
| align="center" | 27
| 2013–14
| 
| Home
| 
| align="center" | 3
| align="center" | 3
| align="center" | 0
| align="center" | 0
| align="center" | 0
| align="center" | 0
| Won
| 
|-
| align="center" | 28
| 2013–14
| 
| Home
| 
| align="center" | 3
| align="center" | 2
| align="center" | 0
| align="center" | 0
| align="center" | 1
| align="center" | 0
| Won
| 
|-
| align="center" | 29
| 2013–14
| 2013–14 PCB Women's Tri-Nation Series in Qatar
| Neutral (in Qatar)
| 
| align="center" | 5
| align="center" | 3
| align="center" | 1
| align="center" | 0
| align="center" | 0
| align="center" | 1
| Won
| 
|-
| align="center" | 30
| 2014–17
| ICC Women's Championship
| Home and Away
| 
| align="center" | 18Note
| align="center" | 8Note
| align="center" | 9Note
| align="center" | 0Note
| align="center" | 1Note
| align="center" | 0Note
| Ongoing tournament
| 
|-
| align="center" | 31
| 2014–15
| 
| Away
| 
| align="center" | 4**
| align="center" | 2**
| align="center" | 1*
| align="center" | 0
| align="center" | 1*
| align="center" | 0
| Won
| 
|-
| align="center" | 32
| 2014–15
| 
| Away
| 
| align="center" | 3*
| align="center" | 2*
| align="center" | 1*
| align="center" | 0
| align="center" | 0
| align="center" | 0
| Won
| 
|-
| align="center" | 33
| 2014–15
| 
| Neutral (in UAE)
| 
| align="center" | 3*
| align="center" | 2*
| align="center" | 1*
| align="center" | 0
| align="center" | 0
| align="center" | 0
| Won
| 
|-
| align="center" | 34
| 2015–16
| 
| Away
| 
| colspan="7" ; align="center" | Cancelled
| 
|-
| align="center" | 35
| 2015–16
| 
| Home
| 
| align="center" | 3*
| align="center" | 1*
| align="center" | 2*
| align="center" | 0
| align="center" | 0
| align="center" | 0
| Lost
| 
|-
| align="center" | 36
| 2015–16
| 
| Home
| 
| align="center" | 3*
| align="center" | 1*
| align="center" | 2*
| align="center" | 0
| align="center" | 0
| align="center" | 0
| Lost
| 
|-
| align="center" | 37
| 2016
| 
| Away
| 
| align="center" | 4
| align="center" | 3
| align="center" | 1
| align="center" | 0
| align="center" | 0
| align="center" | 0
| Won
| 
|-
| align="center" | 38
| 2016–17
| 
| Home
| 
| colspan="7" ; align="center" | Cancelled
| 
|-
| align="center" | 39
| 2016–17
| 
| Home
| 
| align="center" | 7**
| align="center" | 2**
| align="center" | 5**
| align="center" | 0
| align="center" | 0
| align="center" | 0
| Lost
| 
|-
| align="center" | 40
| 2016–17
| 
| Away
| 
| align="center" | [5**]
| align="center" | 
| align="center" | 
| align="center" | 
| align="center" | 
| align="center" | 
| TBD| 
|- class="sortbottom" 
| colspan="5" ; align="center" | Overall Total
| align="center" | 151
| align="center" | 71
| align="center" | 67
| align="center" | 1
| align="center" | 7
| align="center" | 5
| colspan="2" |
|}* Matches also valid and counted for ICC Women's Championship 2014–2017.** The first 3 matches of this series were also part of the ICC Women's Championship 2014–2017, South Africa's results valid for the tournament were 1 won against Sri Lanka; 1 won and 2 lost against New Zealand.Note: It includes matches played on multiple series listed below, therefore, to avoid double count, it is NOT included in the overall total matches count.''

Twenty20 International series

Notes and references

Series
South African cricket lists
South